LaSalle County Nuclear Generating Station, located in Brookfield Township, LaSalle County, Illinois, near Marseilles,  southeast of Ottawa, serves Chicago and Northern Illinois with electricity.  The plant is owned and operated by Constellation Energy following separation from Exelon Corporation in 2022. Its Units 1 and 2 began commercial operation in October 1982, and October 1984, respectively.

It has two General Electric boiling water reactors. LaSalle's Unit 1 and Unit 2 together produce 2,320 megawatts, which is enough electricity for the needs of 2.3 million American homes.
Instead of cooling towers, the station has a  man-made cooling lake, which is also a popular fishery — LaSalle Lake State Fish and Wildlife Area — managed by the Illinois Department of Natural Resources.

Electricity generation

Surrounding population

The 2010 U.S. population within  of LaSalle was 17,643, an increase of 7.1 percent in a decade, according to an analysis of U.S. Census data for msnbc.com. The 2010 U.S. population within  was 1,902,775, an increase of 22.6 percent since 2000. Cities within 50 miles include Joliet (34 miles to city center).

Site area emergency
On February 20, 2006, a "site area emergency" was declared at the plant at 12:28 AM.  This was the first SAE declared at a US nuclear plant since 1991.  Workers were shutting down Unit 1 for refueling when the plant's turbine control system malfunctioned, SCRAMing the reactor.  The reactor had been operating at 6 percent power output at the time.  Plant instruments indicated three of 185 control rods used to shut down the reactor were not fully inserted triggering the emergency declaration.  After a reset, the plant's instruments indicated that only one control rod was not fully inserted, not three.  The emergency ended at 4:27 AM with no damage or release of radioactivity.

Post trip evaluations have confirmed that all control rods were fully inserted within four minutes of the reactor SCRAM. A review indicates the problem was with the indication sensors, and that all control rods were fully inserted immediately at the time of the reactor scram. Follow-up evaluations also demonstrated that even if the three subject control rods remained fully withdrawn in a cold shutdown condition, the reactor would have remained adequately shutdown.

Seismic risk
The Nuclear Regulatory Commission's estimate of the risk each year of an earthquake intense enough to cause core damage to the reactor at LaSalle was 1 in 357,143, according to an NRC study published in August 2010.

See also
List of largest power stations in the United States

Notes

External links

NukeWorker

Buildings and structures in LaSalle County, Illinois
Energy infrastructure completed in 1984
Exelon
Nuclear power plants in Illinois